Cristián Andrés Morán Vallejos (born 27 July 1984) was a Chilean footballer.

He is remembered for his spell at Cobreloa, Primera División de Chile's powerhouse club.

Career
Morán began his career playing in the lower divisions of Fernández Vial from 1996 to 2002. Then he went to Cobreloa, at the age of 19. In the Clausura 2007 championship he went to Deportes Antofagasta. He signed for Deportivo Ñublense for the 2008 season.

Honours

Club
Cobreloa
 Primera División de Chile (3): 2003 Apertura, 2003 Clausura, 2004 Clausura

External links
 BDFA profile

1984 births
Living people
People from Concepción Province, Chile
Chilean footballers
Ñublense footballers
Cobreloa footballers
Deportes Concepción (Chile) footballers
C.D. Antofagasta footballers
C.D. Arturo Fernández Vial footballers
Association football defenders